Hippo Regius (also known as Hippo or Hippone) is the ancient name of the modern city of Annaba, Algeria. It historically served as an important city for the Phoenicians, Berbers, Romans, and Vandals. Hippo was the capital city of the Vandal Kingdom from 435 to 439 AD. until it was shifted to Carthage following the Vandal Capture of Carthage (439).

It was the focus of several early Christian councils and home to Augustine of Hippo, a Church Father highly important in Western Christianity.

History 

The town was first settled by Phoenicians from Tyre around the 12th centuryBC. To distinguish it from Hippo Diarrhytus (the modern Bizerte, in Tunisia), the Romans later referred to it as Hippo Regius ("the Royal Hippo") because it was one of the residences of the Numidian kings. Its nearby river was Latinized as the Ubus and the bay to its east was known as Hippo Bay.

A maritime city near the mouth of the river Ubus, it became a Roman colonia which prospered and became a major city in Roman Africa. It is perhaps most famous as the bishopric of Saint Augustine of Hippo in his later years. In AD 430, the Vandals advanced eastwards along the North African coast and laid siege to the walled city of Hippo Regius. Inside, Saint Augustine and his priests prayed for relief from the invaders, knowing full well that the fall of the city would spell death or conversion to the Arian heresy for much of the Christian population. On 28 August 430, three months into the siege, St. Augustine (who was 75 years old) died, perhaps from starvation or stress, as the wheat fields outside the city lay dormant and unharvested. After 14 months, hunger and the inevitable diseases were ravaging both the city inhabitants and the Vandals outside the city walls. The city fell to the Vandals and King Geiseric made it the first capital of the Vandal Kingdom until the capture of Carthage in 439.

It was conquered by the Eastern Roman Empire in 534 and was kept under Roman rule until 698, when it fell to the Muslims; the Arabs rebuilt the town in the eighth century. The city's later history is treated under its modern (Arabic and colonial) names.

About three kilometres distant in the eleventh century, the Berber Zirids established the town of Beleb-el-Anab, which the Spaniards occupied for some years in the sixteenth century, as the French did later, in the reign of Louis XIV. France took this town again in 1832. It was renamed Bône or Bona, and became one of the government centres for the Constantine (departement) in Algeria. It had 37,000 inhabitants, of whom 10,800 were original inhabitants, consisting of 9,400 Muslims and 1,400 naturalized Jews. 15,700 were French and 10,500 foreigners, including many Italians.

Ecclesiastical history 

Hippo was an ancient bishopric, one of many suffragans in the former Roman province of Numidia, a part of the residential see of Constantine. It contains some ancient ruins, a hospital built by the Little Sisters of the Poor and a fine basilica dedicated to St. Augustine. Under St. Augustine there were at least three monasteries in the diocese besides the episcopal monastery.

The diocese was established around 250 AD. Only these six bishops of Hippo are known:
 Saint Theogenes(256? – martyr 259?)
 Saint Leontius (? – 303?)
 Fidentius (? – martyr ?304)
 Valerius (388? – 396), who ordained St. Augustine
 the "Doctor of Grace", Saint Augustine (354 – 28 August 430, coadjutor in 395, bishop in 396)
 Heraclius (coadjutor in 426, bishop in 430).

It was suppressed around 450 AD.

Council of Hippo 

Three church councils were held at Hippo (393, 394, 426) and more synods – also in 397 (two sessions, June and September) and 401, all under Aurelius.

The synods of the Ancient (North) African church were held, with but few exceptions (e.g. Hippo, 393; Milevum, 402) at Carthage. We know from the letters of Saint Cyprian that, except in time of persecution, the African bishops met at least once a year, in the springtime, and sometimes again in the autumn. Six or seven synods, for instance, were held under St. Cyprian's presidency during the decade of his administration (249–258), and more than fifteen under Aurelius (391–429). The Synod of Hippo of 393 ordered a general meeting yearly, but this was found too onerous for the bishops, and in the Synod of Carthage (407) it was decided to hold a general synod only when necessary for the needs of all Africa, and it was to be held at a place most convenient for the purpose. Not all the bishops of the country were required to assist at the general synod. At the Synod of Hippo (393) it was ordered that "dignities" should be sent from each ecclesiastical province. Only one was required from Tripoli (in Libya), because of the poverty of the bishops of that province. At the Synod of Hippo (393), and again at the Synod of 397 at Carthage, a list of the books of Holy Scripture was drawn up, and these books (including some considered apocryphal by Protestants) are still regarded as the constituents of the Catholic canon.

Titular episcopal see 
The Hippo(ne) diocese was nominally revived in 1400 as Catholic Latin titular bishopric of the (lowest) episcopal rank, for which no incumbent is recorded.

It ceased to exist on 23 September 1867, when the see was formally united with the Roman Catholic Diocese of Constantine.

See also 

 Auzia
 Caesarea of Mauretania
 Cirta
 Chullu
 Mauretania Caesariensis
 Milevum
 List of cultural assets of Algeria

References

Notes

Citations

Sources

Further reading

 Laffi, Umberto. Colonie e municipi nello Stato romano  Ed. di Storia e Letteratura. Roma, 2007  
 Mommsen, Theodore. The Provinces of the Roman Empire Section: Roman Africa. (Leipzig 1865; London 1866; London: Macmillan 1909; reprint New York 1996) Barnes & Noble. New York, 1996
 Smyth Vereker, Charles. Scenes in the Sunny South: Including the Atlas Mountains and the Oases of the Sahara in Algeria. Volume 2. Publisher Longmans, Green, and Company. University of Wisconsin. Madison,1871 ( Roman Hippo Regius )

External links
 GigaCatholic, with residential episcopal incumbents biography links 

12th-century BC establishments
Annaba
Archaeological sites in Algeria
Catholic titular sees in Africa
Numidia (Roman provinces)
Phoenician colonies in Algeria
Populated places established in the 2nd millennium BC
Roman towns and cities in Algeria